The Cathedral of St Andrew and St Michael is a religious building that is affiliated with the Anglican Church of South Africa and is located at 85 St Georges Street in the city of Bloemfontein in the Free State province, South Africa.

It serves as the main church and seat of the Diocese of the Free State which was created in 1863. The current dean is Lazarus Mohapi.

References

Anglican cathedrals in South Africa
Buildings and structures in Bloemfontein
Churches in the Free State (province)